8 Berkley Drive is a historic house located at the address of the same name in Lockport, Niagara County, New York.

Description and history 
It is a two-story, Prairie-style home designed by noted regional architect Duane Lyman in 1957. It was designed and built for the late Laurence Maxwell Ferguson and his wife Lurana Persing Ferguson.

It was listed on the National Register of Historic Places on May 4, 2009.

References

Houses on the National Register of Historic Places in New York (state)
Prairie School architecture in New York (state)
Houses completed in 1957
Houses in Niagara County, New York
National Register of Historic Places in Niagara County, New York